Rosemary Kirstein is an American science fiction writer. She has written four novels in the Steerswoman's series and two more are in the works.  She currently lives in Connecticut, near Springfield, Massachusetts.

Kirstein did not consider writing her "day job", and thus produced work at a slow rate, until she left that day job.

Novels

The Steerswoman (1989)
The Outskirter's Secret (1992)
The Lost Steersman (2003)
The Language of Power (2004)
The Changes of the Dark (forthcoming) 
The City in the Crags (forthcoming)

References

External links
Author's official website
Not only science fiction, but more science fictional than anything else: Rosemary Kirstein’s Steerswoman books (review by Jo Walton)
The Steerswoman Series by Rosemary Kirstein (review)
Rosemary Kirstein's The Steerswoman (review by Kate Nepveu)

20th-century American novelists
21st-century American novelists
American science fiction writers
American women novelists
Women science fiction and fantasy writers
Living people
20th-century American women writers
21st-century American women writers
Year of birth missing (living people)